Crates (c. 365 – c. 285 BC) of Thebes was a Greek Cynic philosopher, the principal pupil of Diogenes of Sinope and the husband of Hipparchia of Maroneia who lived in the same manner as him. Crates gave away his money to live a life of poverty on the streets of Athens. Respected by the people of Athens, he is remembered for being the teacher of Zeno of Citium, the founder of Stoicism. Various fragments of Crates' teachings survive, including his description of the ideal Cynic state.

Life
Crates was born c. 365 BC in Thebes. He was the son of Ascondus, and was the heir to a large fortune, which he is said to have renounced to live a life of Cynic poverty in Athens. Diogenes Laërtius preserves several different accounts of this story; one of them has Crates giving his money away to the citizens of Thebes, apparently after seeing the beggar king Telephus in a tragedy; whereas another account has him placing his money in the hands of a banker, with the agreement that he should deliver it to his sons, unless they too became philosophers, in which case he should distribute it among the poor.

He moved to Athens where tradition says he became a pupil of Diogenes of Sinope; the precise relationship between Crates and Diogenes is uncertain, but there is one apparent reference to Crates referring to himself as "a fellow-citizen of Diogenes, who defied all the plots of envy". Crates is also described as being the student of Bryson the Achaean, and of Stilpo.  He lived a life of cheerful simplicity, and Plutarch, who wrote a detailed biography of Crates which unfortunately does not survive, records what sort of man Crates was:

He is said to have been deformed with a lame leg and hunched shoulders. He was nicknamed the Door-Opener because he would enter any house and people would receive him gladly and with honour:

He attracted the attentions of Hipparchia of Maroneia, the sister of one of Crates' students, Metrocles. Hipparchia is said to have fallen in love with Crates and with his life and teachings, and thus rejecting her wealthy upbringing in a manner similar to Crates, she married him. The marriage was remarkable (for ancient Athens) for being based on mutual respect and equality between the couple.  Stories about Hipparchia appearing in public everywhere with Crates are mentioned precisely because respectable women did not behave in that way, and as part of Cynic shamelessness, they had sexual intercourse in public.  They had at least two children, a girl, and a boy named Pasicles.  We learn that Crates is supposed to have initiated his son into sex by taking him to a brothel, and he allowed his daughter a month's trial marriage to potential suitors.

He was the teacher of Zeno of Citium in the last years of the century, and was undoubtedly the biggest influence on Zeno in his development of Stoic philosophy.  Zeno always regarded Crates with the greatest respect, and some of the accounts we have of Crates have probably come down to us via Zeno's writings. His other pupils included Metrocles, Monimus, Menippus, Cleomenes, Theombrotus, and Crates' brother Pasicles. He may also have taught Cleanthes, Zeno's successor as head of the Stoic school.

Crates was, apparently, in Thebes in 307 BC, when Demetrius Phalereus was exiled there. He is said to have died at a great age (c. 285 BC), and was buried in Boeotia.

Philosophy
According to Diogenes Laërtius, Crates wrote a book of letters on philosophical subjects, the style of which Diogenes compares to that of Plato;. There are 36 surviving Cynic epistles attributed to Crates, but these are later, 1st-century, compositions.

Crates was also the author of some philosophical tragedies, and some smaller poems apparently called Games (Paignia).

Several fragments of his thought survive.  He taught a simple asceticism, which seems to have been milder than that of his predecessor Diogenes:

Some of his philosophical writings were infused with humour, in the form of spoudaiogeloion.  He urged people not to prefer anything but lentils in their meals, because luxury and extravagance were the chief causes of seditions and insurrections in a city.  This jest would later be the cause of much satire, as in book 4 of Athenaeus' Deipnosophistae where a group of Cynics sit down for a meal and are served course after course of lentil soup.

One of his poems parodied a famous hymn to the Muses written by Solon.  But whereas Solon wished for prosperity, reputation, and "justly acquired possessions," Crates had typically Cynic desires:

There are also several fragments surviving of a poem Crates wrote describing the ideal Cynic state which begins by parodying Homer's description of Crete. Crates' city is called Pera, which in Greek refers to the beggar's wallet which every Cynic carried:

The word tuphos in the first line, is one of the first known Cynic uses of a word which literally means mist or smoke. It was used by the Cynics to describe the mental confusion which most people are wrapped-up in.  The Cynics sought to clear away this fog and to see the world as it really is.

Later cultural references
The relationship between Crates and Hipparchia became the subject of a number of fictional accounts, such as the play Spozalizio d' Ipparchia filosofa, written by Italian nun Clemenza Ninci in the 17th century, or Christoph Martin Wieland's novel Krates und Hipparchia (1804). A fictional biography of Crates was written by French author Marcel Schwob in his 1896 work Vies imaginaires.

References

Sources

Laërtius, Diogenes (1925c). "The Cynics: Crates". Lives of the Eminent Philosophers. Translated by Hicks, Robert Drew (Two volume ed.). Loeb Classical Library. §85–93

External links

Crates and Hipparchia Handbook

4th-century BC Greek people
4th-century BC philosophers
Ancient Greek political philosophers
Ancient Thebans
Cynic philosophers
Hellenistic-era philosophers in Athens
Metic philosophers in Classical Athens